The Blue Riband is an unofficial accolade given to the passenger liner crossing the Atlantic Ocean in regular service with the record highest average speed. The term was borrowed from horse racing and was not widely used until after 1910. The record is based on average speed rather than passage time because ships follow different routes. 
Also, eastbound and westbound speed records are reckoned separately, as the more difficult westbound record voyage, against the Gulf Stream and the prevailing weather systems, typically results in lower average speeds.

Of the 35 Atlantic liners to hold the Blue Riband, 25 were British, followed by five German, three American, as well as one each from Italy and France. Thirteen were Cunarders (plus Queen Mary of Cunard White Star), five by White Star, with four owned by Norddeutscher Lloyd, two by Collins, two by Inman and two by Guion, and one each by British American, Great Western, Hamburg-America, the Italian Line, Compagnie Générale Transatlantique and finally the United States Lines.
The record set by United States in 1952 remains unbroken by any passenger liner. The next-longest period through which the Blue Riband was retained was 19 years, held from 1909 to 1929 by Mauretania. The shortest period was six weeks, by Bremen from July to August 1933.

Many of these ships were built with substantial government subsidies and were designed with military considerations in mind. Winston Churchill estimated that the two Cunard Queens helped shorten the Second World War by a year. The last Atlantic liner to hold the Blue Riband, the SS United States, was designed for her potential use as a troopship as well as her service as a commercial passenger liner. There was no formal award until 1935, when Harold K. Hales donated the Hales Trophy; though the rules for the Hales Trophy were different from the traditional rules for the Blue Riband (for example, the Hales Trophy was originally only awarded for westbound records) and changed several times thereafter. It was awarded to just three Blue Riband holders during the express liner era. The trophy continues to be awarded, though many people believe United States remains as the holder of the Blue Riband, because no subsequent record-breaker was in Atlantic passenger service.

Background
The first well-documented crossing of the North Atlantic, though not the earliest, was that of John Cabot's ship Matthew in the summer of 1497. Matthew crossed from Bristol to Newfoundland in 35 days, returning the following month in just 17 days.
Over the next three centuries, countless vessels (merchant ships and warships, fast and slow, in peace and war) crossed back and forth over the North Atlantic, all subject to the vagaries of wind and weather. They arrived at port when they could, dependent on the wind, and left when they were loaded, frequently visiting other ports to complete their routes. During this period eastbound passages of 30 and 45 days were not uncommon, while westward passages of 65 to 90 days excited no attention. It was the advent of the steamship, with its independence from wind power, which offered the possibility of regular, scheduled Atlantic crossings, in periods of two to three weeks, that opened a new era of transatlantic travel and competition.

History
The term "Blue Riband of the Atlantic" did not come into use until the 1890s, and the history of the trans-Atlantic competition, which was compiled retrospectively, was regarded as starting with the crossings by the steamships Sirius and Great Western in 1838. Although not the first steamships to cross the Atlantic (Savannah had crossed in 1819, and Royal William in 1831) nor the fastest to make the crossing (the packet sailing ship Columbia crossed west to east in 15 days 23 hours in 1830, and crossings by sail packets of 16 and 17 days were not unheard of) the Sirius and Great Western were the first steamships offering a regular, scheduled trans-Atlantic service; and crucially, they were involved in a race. Cunard refused officially to recognise the title because racing vessels was not in line with the company's safety policy.

Paddlers (1838–1872)

The idea of building a line of transatlantic steamships was mooted in 1832 by Junius Smith, an American lawyer turned London merchant.  The idea came to him during an Atlantic crossing which took 57 days, a not unusual occurrence, and it was published in the American Rail Road Journal. After receiving no support for several years, his plan gained credibility when Scottish shipbuilder, Macgregor Laird became an investor. Smith, who is often considered the Father of the Atlantic Liner, formed the British and American Steam Navigation Company to operate a London-New York service. About the same time, the question of Atlantic steamships was discussed at an 1835 director's meeting of the newly formed Great Western Railway when the line's chief engineer, Isambard Kingdom Brunel supposedly joked that the line could be made longer by building a steamship to run between Bristol and New York. The necessary investors were recruited by Brunel's friend, Thomas Guppy, a Bristol engineer and businessman. The next year, the Great Western Steamship Company was established, even though the rail line was still years from completion.

By spring 1838, Brunel's  was ready for sea, but Smith's first ship was still without engines. When Great Western scheduled its initial sailing, Laird suggested that British and American charter the Irish Sea steamer  from the St. George Steam Packet Company for two voyages to beat Great Western. While the Sirius left Cork, Ireland four days before Great Western departed Avonmouth, Great Western still came within a day of overtaking Sirius to New York. To complete the voyage, Sirius was forced to burn spars when coal ran low. With her westbound crossing at 8.03 knots (14.87 km/h), Sirius is often considered the first record holder even though she would have held the record for only one day, until Great Western'''s arrival from her even faster crossing. However the notion of a "Blue Riband" would not be used for several decades.

The Cunard Line started its Liverpool-Halifax-Boston service in 1840 with the four ships that were slightly reduced versions of Great Western with about the same speed. Ultimately Cunard built nine additional wood paddlers. By 1846, Cunard was the only original steamship line that survived, largely because of its subsidy from the British Admiralty to carry the mails and its emphasis on safety. Until 1850, the record passed between various Cunarders, finally reaching  for an 8-day Liverpool-Halifax crossing by Asia. Record voyages during this period were often the result of using sails to gain extra speed from a following gale.

Cunard's first serious competition for the record came from the American-owned Collins Line. The American Government supplied Collins with a substantial subsidy to operate four wooden paddlers that were superior to Cunard's best. Unfortunately, Collins suffered a setback when its  foundered with heavy loss of life. During the Crimean War, Cunard supplied eleven of its ships for war service and suspended all routes except the Liverpool–Halifax–Boston service. While the Collins' fortunes improved because of the lack of competition during the war, Collins collapsed in 1858 after the loss of two additional steamers. Scotia was the final significant paddler ordered for the Atlantic because under the terms of Cunard's mail contract with the Admiralty, it was still required to supply paddle steamers when needed for military service.

Single screw steamers (1872–1889)

In 1845, Brunel's  became the first iron-hulled screw liner on the Atlantic. Starting in 1850, the Inman Line built numerous reduced versions for the steerage trade. In 1866, Inman started to commission single screw express liners that were the equal of Scotia. The Admiralty allowed Cunard to order its first screw express liner, the Russia. In 1871 both companies faced a new rival when the White Star Line commissioned Oceanic and her five sisters. The new White Star record-breakers were especially economical because of their use of compound engines, but their high ratio of length to beam (10:1 compared to the previous norm of 8:1) increased vibration. To counter this, White Star placed the dining saloon midships and made their ships more luxurious. Inman rebuilt its express fleet to the new standard, but Cunard lagged behind both of its rivals. In 1875, Inman's new City of Berlin averaged  on its record-breaking voyage.

During the five-year shipping depression that began in 1873, William Pearce, the controlling partner of the John Elder shipyard, became convinced that a crack steamer that carried only passengers and light freight could be profitable because she would attract more passengers and spend less time in port. He proposed a ship that crammed the most powerful machinery possible into the hull, sacrificing everything to speed. When Cunard rejected his proposal, Pearce offered his idea to the Guion Line, a firm primarily engaged in the steerage trade. The first ship Pearce built for Guion, the Arizona was described as a "souped-up transatlantic hot rod" by one nautical historian. These ships were uncomfortable and their excessive coal consumption made them uneconomic. However, for a while they were popular with American clients because of their American ownership.

After being out of the contest for a decade, Cunard finally started to rebuild. In 1884, Cunard purchased Oregon from the Guion line when that firm defaulted on payments to the shipyard. Later that year, Cunard commissioned the first steel-hulled record-breakers, Umbria and Etruria. However, Etruria and her sister represented the limit of single screw technology.

Double screw steamers (1889–1907)

The Inman line fell on hard times after their intended record-breaker, City of Rome failed to meet expectations and was returned to her builders in 1882. Inman directors agreed to voluntary liquidation so that the largest creditor, the Philadelphia-based International Navigation Company could purchase Inman's assets. Cunard countered with two even faster ships, the Campania and the Lucania of 1893. Inman became the American Line and ordered two additional express liners from American yards, but no attempt was made to best the new Cunarders. In 1894, Guion ceased sailing as its ships were now hopelessly outdated.

No sooner had Cunard reestablished its supremacy than new rivals emerged. Beginning in the late 1860s, several German firms commissioned liners that were almost as fast as the British mail steamers working from Liverpool. Its rival, Norddeutscher Lloyd (NDL) lagged behind until 1895 when it ordered two ships intended to take the record. Hamburg America ordered the even more powerful  that reached  on one of her record-breaking 1900 voyages. However, Hamburg America quickly learned that these high powered double screw liners had vibration problems. Deutschland had the unpleasant nickname, "cocktail shaker" and actually lost part of her stern in 1902 because of the constant vibration.

Rather than match the new German speedsters, White Star decided to drop out of the competition and commission the four large Celtic-class luxury liners of more moderate speed. White Star realised that passengers preferred comfort even if this means spending an extra day at sea. In 1902, White Star joined the well capitalised American combine, the International Mercantile Marine Co. (IMM) that owned the American Line and others. IMM also had trade agreements with Hamburg America and Norddeutscher Lloyd. After its bad experience with the Deutschland, Hamburg America also dropped out of the race and commissioned large luxury liners based on the Celtic. However, NDL completed building a fleet of four additional express liners modelled on Kaiser Wilhelm der Grosse.

Ships of state (1907–1969)

[[File:Bundesarchiv Bild 102-11081, Schnelldamper "Bremen".jpg|thumb|NDL's Bremen finally broke Mauretania's record in 1929 by averaging ]]

After 1902, only the Cunard Line and the French Compagnie Générale Transatlantique (CGT) were independent of the IMM combine. British prestige was at stake, and the Government provided Cunard with an annual subsidy of £150,000 plus a low-interest loan of £2.5 million to pay for the construction of the two superliners, Lusitania and Mauretania, under the condition that they be available for conversion to armed cruisers when needed by the navy. Starting in 1907, both ships won the Blue Riband and Mauretania's 1909 record of  stood for 20 years. However, these ships paid a price for speed and lacked many of the amenities found in the new White Star and Hamburg American luxury liners. Even Cunard chose this approach when it ordered its third superliner, the Aquitania.

There is a persistent rumor that  was attempting to win the Blue Riband and that such effort resulted in excessive speed and collision with the iceberg. This is likely false, as the Titanic was built for luxury, not speed.

As a result of the war, Hamburg American and Norddeutscher Lloyd lost their premier units. In 1926, the U.S. Government awarded Norddeutscher Lloyd (NDL) $27 million in compensation for its confiscated liners. By this time, improvements in turbine technology and hull form, along with the use of fuel oil instead of coal, made it possible to build more civilised record breakers. However, the American government netted the award against debts owed by the German Government and Berlin was forced to directly subsidise NDL to continue the project.

Construction started on 28 June 1928. However, White Star did not have the funds to complete the liner, and Oceanic's construction was put on hold until 1931 when her keel was silently scrapped. Her ahead-of-their-time engines might have been powerful enough to enable her to win the Blue Riband.

In 1929, two lines from Italy each ordered a ship based on the German pair. Just as these ships were being completed, the Italian government nationalised the shipping industry, creating the Italian Line.

CGT also ordered a new superliner in 1929. The next year, Cunard started construction on an 80,000-ton liner that was to be the first of two record-breakers fast enough to fit into a two-ship weekly Southampton–New York service. Consequently, CGT altered its plans to make its new liner even bigger. However, as the 1929 shipping depression intensified, construction on Cunard's hull 534 was halted while work on the heavily subsidised French ship continued. By 1934, both Cunard and White Star lines were failing and the British Government was concerned about potential job losses.

The two liners were operated as a pair and traded the Blue Riband again, with the Cunard White Star Liner ultimately posting  in 1938. Queen Mary's consort, Queen Elizabeth, was commissioned after war was declared and was never allowed to attempt the record.

In 1935, Harold K. Hales (1868–1942), a member of the UK Parliament and owner of a shipping company, commissioned a large trophy to be presented to the fastest ship crossing the Atlantic, in order to formalize the rules surrounding the trans-Atlantic competition. The rules for the trophy did not correspond to the traditional rules for the Blue Riband in that the trophy was to be awarded only to surface passenger ships achieving the fastest speed in the westbound direction. Other rule changes further complicated the situation, and eventually the trophy was awarded to just three Blue Riband holders; Rex, in 1935, Normandie in 1936, and United States in 1952.

Of the ships of state, only Queen Mary, Queen Elizabeth and Europa survived the war. Europa became CGT's Liberté and no attempt was made to retain her former speed when she was reconstructed. However, the United States government was impressed by the large numbers of troops carried by the Queens during the war and ordered a superliner that was as much a troop carrier as an express liner. In 1958, the transatlantic airlines put jet transports into service and the days of the record breakers were numbered. Liberté retired in 1961, along with Queen Mary in 1967, and United States in 1969.

The Blue Riband today (1969–present)
With the success of United States in 1952 and Cunard's decision not to challenge the new record the Blue Riband contest again subsided. There was a growing recognition that the era of fast crossings by express liners was becoming a thing of the past and that the contest for fast transatlantic travel was shifting to the air.

In the 1930s, air travel was already competing with the express liners for fast Atlantic crossings; in 1936, the German company DELAG commenced an airship service to New York, their Hindenburg crossing from Europe to America in times ranging from 53 to 78 hours, and the following year, while experimenting with a flying boat service, Empire Airways Caledonia reduced this to 15 hours.
In the post-war period times were reduced again by the advent of land-based airliners, such as the Lockheed Constellation. Hopes in 1952 were expressed for the new de Havilland Comet jetliner, though these were dashed by the succession of crashes that halted the Comet programme. A regular jetliner service was finally introduced in 1958 with the Boeing 707 and the DC 8, cutting the crossing to 7 hours. The final step in the quest for trans-Atlantic speed was the Concorde, which set a record in 1996 of a second under two hours 53 minutes, at an average speed of 1250 mph (Mach 1.9), but by this time airlines were aware that cost and comfort were more important to passengers than speed, and the emphasis shifted to aircraft like the Boeing 747, with a sleeper capacity for business passengers. Concorde's crossing was not the fastest ever flight across the Atlantic. That record is still held by a Lockheed SR-71A which crossed the Atlantic in 1 hour 54 minutes in 1974, although that was not carrying commercial passengers. 

At sea United States record stood until 1986 when it was challenged by British entrepreneur Richard Branson, and his high-speed motor vessel, Virgin Atlantic Challenger. Despite having to stop to refuel on several occasions, Branson shaved two hours off the record, increasing the average speed to 36.4 knots. However, as  Virgin Atlantic Challenger was not a passenger vessel the New York Maritime Museum refused to part with the Hales Trophy, so Branson inaugurated the Virgin Atlantic Challenge Trophy, for the fastest unqualified Atlantic crossing, open to all challengers. Three years later this was won by Tom Gentry, whose Gentry Eagle slashed the record, crossing in 62 hours at an average 47.4 knots. 
In 1992 the Virgin Atlantic Challenge was again won, by the Aga Khan's Destriero crossing in 58 hours 34 minutes and averaging 53.09 knots. She also made a record-breaking return journey, winning the Columbus Atlantic Trophy, posted by the yacht club in response to the Virgin Atlantic Challenge for the fastest two-way voyage i.e. a single crossing and return voyage within a specified time.

Meanwhile, Incat, builders of fast catamaran ferries, and therefore indisputably commercial vessels, decided to make an attempt to win the Hales Trophy, for which the record was still that of United States. This was achieved in 1990 by Hoverspeed Great Britain, with a non-stop crossing of 79 hours 54 minutes, averaging 36.6 knots and Incat were awarded the trophy by the Hales Trophy Committee. Eight years later this record was broken by another Incat vessel, Catalonia, and again the following month by Cat-Link V in 68 hours and 9 minutes (41.28 knots).

With the end of the express liners era, the Blue Riband has become an item of largely historical interest, with some authors regarding the United States as the last holder of the accolade. Meanwhile, the goal of the fastest Atlantic crossings remains a physical and technological challenge and at least three awards for the feat remain in play.

List of record breakers
The following is the latest consensus list of the research to date. Because there was no sanctioning body for the Blue Riband, researchers are limited to surviving shipping company archives and press reports to develop the list of Blue Riband winners. These lists are retrospective and limited to steamships only. Therefore, most lists feature Sirius, in her race with Great Western in 1838, as the first record-holder, although her crossing was not as fast as some sail packet ships of the period. Early writers including Arthur Maginnus (1892), Henry Frey (1896), Charles Lee (1931) and C. R. Benstead (1936) were the standard sources until the 1950s. Since then, C. R. Vernon Gibbs (1952), and Noel Bonsor (1975) added to the body of knowledge, with additional detail about the German ships provided by Arnold Kludas.

Over the years, the lists have not agreed. Later writers have included the Scotia claim.

Westbound record breakers

Eastbound record breakers

Footnotes

See also
Transatlantic sailing record
Ocean Rowing Society

References

Further reading
 
 
 which cites

External links
SS Rex flying blue pennant at pinterest

 
Atlantic Ocean
Water transport
Shipping awards